Rudy de Mérode, real name Frédéric Martin (1905 in Silly-sur-Nied, Moselle – ?, probably in Spain) was a French collaborator during the German occupation of France in the Second World War.

Life
Originating in Luxemburg, his family emigrated to France and were naturalised as French citizens in the 1920s.  He studied engineering in Strasbourg and then in Germany, where he was recruited by the Abwehr in 1928.  In 1934 he participated in building works on the Maginot Line and passed on the plans (to which he had access) to the German intelligence services.  Unmasked as a spy in 1935, he was condemned in 1936 to 10 years in jail (which he served at Clairvaux Prison) and 20 years' exile from France.

During the debacle of the Battle of France, hundreds of thousands of prisoners roamed the roads of France.  On 14 June, at Bar-sur-Aube, a group of prisoners was evacuated from the central prison at Clairvaux, including Rudy de Mérode and other spies, who all took advantage of the anarchy to escape and request help from the Germans.

In July 1940, he returned to Paris and set himself up at German military intelligence's HQ in the Hôtel Lutetia.  Attached to a supply office at 18  in Paris as a cover, he spied for the Abwehr alongside another SD agent, the Dutchman  (called the Baron d'Humières).

At first, he gathered intelligence via a team of thirty, under his orders, who he trained himself.  Most of them were fugitives from justice, and he used them to gather equipment and buildings.  His team requisitioned several apartments and hôtels particuliers under the cover of being French or (more often) German policemen.

His speciality was bank convoys, of money gathered from different sources or in the form of gold, jewels, art objects or ingots.  In 1941, he set himself up at 70 boulevard Maurice-Barrès in Neuilly-sur-Seine, but van Houten and de Mérode separated after a disagreement in 1942.

With the aid of the DSK (Devisenschutzkommando) he opened bank vaults, buying gold and silver objects from their owners at a debased price or, if they refused to cooperate, having them deported.  If the property belonged to Jews, it was entirely confiscated and the Gestapo had the owner imprisoned and often deported.  The "gestapo de Neuilly" team confiscated over 4 tonnes of gold, and de Mérode's network accumulated enormous sums of silver and had over 500 people arrested and deported.

Escape to Spain
At the start of 1944, the Abwehr charged him with secretly setting up an office in Spain.  At first setting himself up in Saint-Jean-de-Luz, in mid 1945 he was initially to be found in San Sebastián before reaching Madrid, where he dubbed himself "the prince de Mérode".  In 1953, he was still living in Spain, now 60 km north of Madrid in a brickyard.  He was never brought to justice, and the date of his death remains unknown to this day, though 1970 has been suggested.

See also 

 Friedrich Berger
 Henri Lafont
 Christian Masuy

References
Magazine Historia Hors Série n°26 1972 by Jacques Delarue
Les comtesses de la Gestapo ed. Grasset, 2007 by Cyril Eder, 

1905 births
People from Moselle (department)
French collaborators with Nazi Germany
Year of death unknown
Gestapo personnel